Lyonesse is a novel by Jack Vance published in 1983.

Plot summary
The story is told in several interlocking threads which are not always chronological.

King Casmir of Lyonesse arranges the marriage of his daughter Suldrun to Duke Faude Carfilhiot. 

Princes Aillas and Trewan of Troicinet are sent on a sea voyage to visit the various kingdoms of the Elder Isles to gain experience at statecraft.  While in port, Trewan learns that his father has died and that Aillas is the heir to the throne. Late at night, Trewan pushes Aillas overboard. Aillas washes ashore at the foot of Suldrun's garden.  While he recovers, they become lovers and plan to escape. Aillas goes on a quest to find his son. 

Suldrun delivers a son named Dhrun, who is taken by the fairies and replaced with the changeling Madouc. Dhrun lives nine years in the fairy realm, then sets out through the forest of Tantrevalles, a haunted place. He rescues Glyneth, a girl of about 14, from a troll, and they have a number of adventures before joining Dr. Fidelius. Fidelius is in fact Shimrod, a magician who had his power stolen from him by Faude Carfilhiot and his lover Tamurello. Carfilhiot realizes that Fidelius was Shimrod. He kidnaps Dhrun and Glyneth.

Shimrod can not act directly against Carfilhiot to rescue Glyneth and Dhrun, because that would constitute taking Aillas' side in a political matter and violate Murgen's edict.  However, Aillas has learned that Quilcy, King of South Ulfland, has drowned in his bathtub, and that Aillas is his rightful heir by collateral lineage.  He lands a force of troops in South Ulfland, proclaims his kingship, and demands a show of fealty from Carfilhiot as Carfilhiot's rightful liege lord. Carfilhiot refuses, and Aillas' Troice troops lay siege to his castle.  Aillas' soldiers, informed by his knowledge of the castle's defenses, avoid the traps and pitfalls Carfilhiot has prepared, much to Carfilhiot's dismay.  He calls on Tamurello, who confronts Aillas.  This gives Shimrod an excuse to call on Murgen, who forbids Tamurello from acting and banishes him to his mansion.  Tamurello offers to bring Carfilhiot to his manse, but Carfilhiot refuses to leave his castle. The siege is eventually successful, Dhrun and Glyneth are rescued, and Carfilhiot is hanged as a traitor to his king.  When his body is cremated, a green fume escapes and blows out to sea, where it mixes with the spume and condenses into a "green pearl", which sinks into the sea and is swallowed by a fish.

Aillas, now King of Troicinet, Dascinet and South Ulfland, and his son Dhrun, make a diplomatic visit to Lyonesse.  Casmir is puzzled as to how Aillas, barely out of his teens, could have a nine-year-old son, and why Aillas' face seems rather familiar.

Reception
Greg Costikyan reviewed Lyonesse in Ares Magazine #15 and commented that "Lyonesse will not appeal to all tastes; it is emphatically not written in the telegraphic, Hammet-style prose which many readers find appealing. Like a fine wine, it must be savored, and requires a patient reader. But for those with the patience, it is an eminently rewarding experience."

Dave Langford reviewed Lyonesse for White Dwarf #56, and stated that "Though it has its moments [...] these are diluted by merely adequate passages, as though Vance needs to hoard his strength for this marathon."

Reviews
Review by Faren Miller (1983) in Locus, #267 April 1983
Review by Roger C. Schlobin (1983) in Fantasy Newsletter, #60 June-July 1983
Review by Baird Searles (1983) in Isaac Asimov's Science Fiction Magazine, September 1983
Review by Algis Budrys (1983) in The Magazine of Fantasy & Science Fiction, September 1983
Review by Tom Easton (1983) in Analog Science Fiction/Science Fact, Mid-September 1983
Review by Vincent Omniaveritas (1983) in Cheap Truth #1

References

1983 novels